Wil Röttgen (born September 20, 1966) is a German actor.

Life 
Röttgen was born in Bonn. He studied acting at the Lee Strasberg Theatre Institute London. Following he played at several British stages like the Barons Court Theatre, the Landor Theatre, the Rosemary Branch Theatre, the Peacock Theatre and the Kings Head in London.
Wil Röttgen had his first TV appearance in 1990 for the BBC Since then he acted in a number of successful International TV and Cinema productions such as Band of Brothers with Tom Hanks, Dinotopia, Beyond the Sea and in German Television for Berlin, Berlin, Soko Kitzbühl and Soko Wismar.

Film career 
 999 (1990)
 seaQuest DSV (1994)
 Band of Brothers (2001)
 Bahama Mama (2001)
 Spy Game (2001)
 Charlotte Gray (2001)
 Dinotopia (2002)
 Berlin, Berlin (2002)
 Der Fluch des schwarzen Schwans (2003)
 Beyond the Sea - Musik war sein Leben (2004)
 Aeon Flux (2005)
 SOKO Kitzbühel (2005)
 Anna und die Liebe (2009)
 SOKO Wismar (2009)
 War Horse (2011)
 Falsch (independent feature) (2012)

Producer 
 2001:  Bahama Mama (Raindance Award Winning Short Film)
 2008:  Charlie (Nominated at the Los Angeles Short Film Festival)

Director 
 2008:  Charlie (Nominated at the Los Angeles Short Film Festival)

External links 
 
 
  Filmreport
  www.kino.de,
  www.cineman.ch

1966 births
Living people
German male stage actors
German male film actors
German male television actors
Actors from Bonn